St. Peter (Romansh: Son Peder) is a village in the district of Plessur in the canton of Graubünden, Switzerland. An independent municipality before, it merged on 1 January 2008 with neighboring Pagig to form the municipality of St. Peter-Pagig.

History
St. Peter is first referred to as a village in the late Middle Ages.  The village church is first mentioned in 831.  The church and the village section of Laeschgas belonged to Pfäfers Abbey.

Geography

Of this area, 61% is used for agricultural purposes, while 30.1% is forested. Of the rest of the land, 4.2% is settled (buildings or roads) and the remainder (4.7%) is non-productive (rivers, glaciers or mountains).

It consists of the village of St. Peter which is made up of two sections. In 2008 St. Peter merged with Pagig to form St. Peter-Pagig.

Nearby is the Sankt Peter-Molinis railway station, on the Chur-Arosa railway line, which also serves Molinis.

Demographics
St. Peter has a population of 168, of which 15.5% are foreign nationals.  Over the last 10 years the population has grown at a rate of 8.4%.  Most of the population speaks German (95.5%), with Albanian being second most common ( 2.6%) and French being third ( 0.6%).

, the gender distribution of the population was 54.2% male and 45.8% female.  The age distribution, in St. Peter is; 7 children or 4.5% of the population are between 0 and 9 years old and 16 teenagers or 10.4% are between 10 and 19.  Of the adult population, 13 people or 8.4% of the population are between 20 and 29 years old.  15 people or 9.7% are between 30 and 39, 25 people or 16.2% are between 40 and 49, and 26 people or 16.9% are between 50 and 59.  The senior population distribution is 27 people or 17.5% of the population are between 60 and 69 years old, 19 people or 12.3% are between 70 and 79, there are 4 people or 2.6% who are between 80 and 89 there are 2 people or 1.3% who are between 90 and 99.

In the 2007 federal election the most popular party was the SVP which received 67.9% of the vote.  The next three most popular parties were the FDP (13.5%), the SP (9.3%) and the CVP (4.2%).

The entire Swiss population is generally well educated.  In St. Peter about 67% of the population (between age 25–64) have completed either non-mandatory upper secondary education or additional higher education (either University or a Fachhochschule).

St. Peter has an unemployment rate of 0.43%.  , there were 6 people employed in the primary economic sector and about 2 businesses involved in this sector.  14 people are employed in the secondary sector and there are 3 businesses in this sector.  18 people are employed in the tertiary sector, with 9 businesses in this sector.

The historical population is given in the following table:

References

External links

Official website 

Arosa
Former municipalities of Graubünden
Villages in Graubünden